CTL* is a superset of computational tree logic (CTL) and linear temporal logic (LTL). It freely combines path quantifiers and temporal operators. Like CTL, CTL* is a branching-time logic. The formal semantics of CTL* formulae are defined with respect to a given Kripke structure.

History 

LTL had been proposed for the verification of computer programs, first by Amir Pnueli in 1977. Four years later in 1981 E. M. Clarke and E. A. Emerson invented CTL and CTL model checking. CTL* was defined by E. A. Emerson and Joseph Y. Halpern in 1983.

CTL and LTL were developed independently before CTL*. Both sublogics have become standards in the model checking community, while CTL* is of practical importance because it provides an expressive testbed for representing and comparing  these and other logics. This is surprising because the computational complexity of model checking in CTL* is not worse than that of LTL: they both lie in PSPACE.

Syntax 
The language of well-formed CTL* formulae is generated by the following unambiguous (with respect to bracketing) context-free grammar:

where  ranges over a set of atomic formulas. Valid CTL*-formulae are built using the nonterminal . These formulae are called state formulae, while those created by the symbol  are called path formulae. (The above grammar contains some redundancies; for example  as well as implication and equivalence can be defined as just for Boolean algebras (or propositional logic) from negation and conjunction, and the temporal operators X and U are sufficient to define the other two.)

The operators basically are the same as in CTL. However, in CTL, every temporal operator has to be directly preceded by a quantifier, while in  CTL* this is not required. The universal path quantifier may be defined in CTL* in the same way as for classical predicate calculus , although this is not possible in the CTL fragment.

Examples of formulae 

 CTL* formula that is neither in LTL or in CTL: 
 LTL formula that is not in CTL: 
 CTL formula that is not in LTL: 
 CTL* formula that is in CTL and LTL: 

Remark: When taking LTL as subset of CTL*, any LTL formula is implicitly prefixed with the universal path quantifier .

Semantics 
The semantics of CTL* are defined with respect to some Kripke structure. As the names imply, state formulae are interpreted with respect to the states of this structure, while path formulae are interpreted over paths on it.

State formulae 
If a state  of the Kripke structure satisfies a state formula  it is denoted . This relation is defined inductively as follows:

 
 
 
 
 
 
 
  for all paths  starting in 
  for some path  starting in

Path formulae 
The satisfaction relation  for path formulae  and a path  is also defined inductively. For this, let  denote the sub-path :

Decision problems 
CTL* model checking (of an input formula on a fixed model) is PSPACE-complete  and the satisfiability problem is 2EXPTIME-complete.

See also 

 Temporal logic
 Kripke structure
 Model checking
 Reo Coordination Language

References 

 Amir Pnueli: The temporal logic of programs. Proceedings of the 18th IEEE Annual Symposium on Foundations of Computer Science (FOCS), 1977, 46–57. DOI= 10.1109/SFCS.1977.32
 E. Allen Emerson, Joseph Y. Halpern: "Sometimes" and "not never" revisited: on branching versus linear time temporal logic. Journal of the ACM 33, 1 (Jan. 1986), 151–178. DOI= http://doi.acm.org/10.1145/4904.4999
 Ph. Schnoebelen: The Complexity of Temporal Logic Model Checking. Advances in Modal Logic 2002: 393–436

External links 
CTL Teaching slides of professor Alessandro Artale at the Free University of Bozen-Bolzano

Logic in computer science
Temporal logic